Pärnu Jalgpalliklubi, commonly known as PJK, or simply as Pärnu, was a women's football team based in Pärnu, Estonia. Having won a record 13 Naiste Meistriliiga titles, 6 Estonian Women's Cups and 7 Estonian Women's Supercups, the team stepped down from women's football in 2019. The club's home ground was Pärnu Rannastaadion.

The club announced their dissolvement at the end of December 2019 and played their last game on 12 January 2020.

The club's men's team currently plays in the third division Esiliiga B.

History
Pärnu Jalgpalliklubi was founded in 1989. The team won their first league title in the 1994–95 season. Pärnu made their European debut in the 2004–05 UEFA Women's Cup, finishing fourth in their group in the first qualifying round. In the 2013–14 UEFA Women's Champions League, Pärnu finished as runners-up in their group and advanced to the knockout-stage, where they were defeated by eventual champions VfL Wolfsburg 0–27 on aggregate.

Players

First-team squad
As of 13 August 2018.

Honours
 Naiste Meistriliiga
 Winners (13): 1994–95, 2003, 2004, 2005, 2006, 2010, 2011, 2012, 2013, 2014, 2015, 2016, 2017

 Estonian Women's Cup
 Winners (6): 2010, 2011, 2012, 2014, 2015, 2017

 Estonian Women's Supercup
 Winners (7): 2011, 2012, 2013, 2014, 2015, 2016, 2017

Record in UEFA competitionsAll results (home, away and aggregate) list Pärnu's goal tally first.''

References

External links
  
 Pärnu at Estonian Football Association
 UEFA profile
 at Facebook

Defunct football clubs in Estonia
Women's football clubs in Estonia
1989 establishments in Estonia
Association football clubs established in 1989
Sport in Pärnu
 
Association football clubs disestablished in 2020
2020 disestablishments in Estonia